is an Apollo asteroid and a near-Earth object discovered in September 2013 by the Catalina Sky Survey. The asteroid is roughly 300 meters in diameter. It was listed on the Sentry Risk Table in September 2013. It was detected by radar soon after discovery. On 2013-Oct-17 the asteroid passed  from Earth.

See also
 List of Apollo asteroids

References

External links 
 
 
 

Minor planet object articles (unnumbered)

20130908